Dalmuir railway station is a railway station serving the Dalmuir area of Clydebank, West Dunbartonshire, Scotland. It is a large, five-platform interchange between the Argyle Line, North Clyde Line and West Highland Line.

The station is very close to the Dalmuir drop lock on the Forth and Clyde Canal.

History 

The original two platform station located on Park Road, was the first stop after Maryhill Park on the Glasgow, Dumbarton and Helensburgh Railway opened in May 1858.  The station was relocated to its current location in 1897 by the North British Railway and enlarged to four platforms to accommodate the extension of the Glasgow, Yoker and Clydebank Railway from  - the new line met the older one via  immediately west of the original platforms at Dalmuir Park Junction after passing beneath the former GD&HR line a few yards to the east. The station was known as Dalmuir Park between 1952 and 1973 A fifth platform was added as part of the Argyle Line expansion in 1979.

Station layout

There are four through platforms, two on the  branch & two on the  branch along with a terminal bay platform from the Yoker branch constructed as part of the Argyle Line improvement works in 1979 under British Rail. Trains terminating from the Singer branch reverse in a turnback siding to the west of the station just past the junction. The two inner platforms link up at the north end of the station, where there were formerly two footbridges - one spanning each pair of lines.  However these were dismantled in 2010 after being replaced by a new, fully disability-accessible bridge fitted with three lifts that links all five platforms.  The other station buildings are Portakabin-type structures erected in the early 1980s to replace the original stone ones.

Services 

Passenger services are provided by ScotRail and Caledonian Sleeper. As befits a junction station with two alternative routes to the city and access to both main stations there ( Low Level and Glasgow Central (Low Level)) there are a wide range of destinations available. Northbound, there are 2 trains per hour each to both  and  via , plus a further 2tph that terminate at the latter.

Arrivals from the Argyle line however, are from Motherwell via Hamilton and Yoker (of which 1tph is from Cumbernauld via Coatbridge Central) and from Whifflet via Carmyle and Singer (of which 1tph is from Motherwell) rather than Larkhall.

On Sundays there is a simplified pattern in operation - Helensburgh to Edinburgh via Singer and Queen St, and Balloch via Yoker and Central LL to either Larkhall or Motherwell via Whifflet (hourly by each route).

The Highland Sleeper service also calls in each direction daily (except Saturday nights southbound and Sunday mornings northbound), giving the station a direct link to/from London Euston via the West Coast Main Line.

Notes

References

External links 
 Video footage of Dalmuir railway station.

Railway stations in West Dunbartonshire
Former North British Railway stations
Railway stations in Great Britain opened in 1858
Railway stations served by ScotRail
Railway stations served by Caledonian Sleeper
SPT railway stations
Clydebank